K. Daniel Haley (May 25, 1929 – February 8, 2013) was an American politician who served in the New York State Assembly from 1971 to 1976.

He died on February 8, 2013, in Massena, New York at age 83.

References

1929 births
2013 deaths
Democratic Party members of the New York State Assembly